The San Diego County Board of Supervisors is the legislative branch of the county government of San Diego County, California. Though officially nonpartisan, three Democrats and two Republicans currently comprise the Board of Supervisors, with the latest election occurring in 2020.

History
Between 1995 and 2013, the same five people, all Republican, held seats in the Board of Supervisors: Greg Cox, Bill Horn, Diane Jacob, Ron Roberts, and Pam Slater-Price. In 2012, Democrat Dave Roberts won the seat from the retiring Slater-Price, who endorsed his candidacy. However, Encinitas Mayor Kristin Gaspar, a Republican, unseated the lone Democrat in 2016, whose campaign was harmed by a workplace scandal. In 2018, Nathan Fletcher defeated former San Diego County District Attorney Bonnie Dumanis to take Ron Roberts' seat, returning a Democrat to the Board of Supervisors.

In the 2020 election, the Democrats won control of the Board of Supervisors for the first time in decades as Nora Vargas and Terra Lawson-Remer won elections in their respective supervisory districts. Meanwhile, Republican former state Senator Joel Anderson narrowly defeated Poway Mayor Steve Vaus, a fellow Republican, to succeed the retiring Jacob.

Governance
Following Proposition B's passage by San Diego County voters in 2010, county supervisors became limited to two terms of four years. The proposition did not immediately affect incumbent supervisors, whose current and previous terms did not count.

Members
In accordance with Article II, Section 6 of the Constitution of California, members of the San Diego County Board of Supervisors are officially nonpartisan.

Committees
As of the term beginning January 2021, the Board of Supervisors has the following nine committees.

See also

 San Diego City Council

References

External links
 

 
County government in California
County governing bodies in the United States